The 2009 East Asian Games opening ceremony was held on December 5, 2009 at Tsim Sha Tsui, Hong Kong.  The opening began at 8pm at the Hong Kong Cultural Centre on a floating stage set up at Victoria Harbour.  The production team was the same one that ran the 2008 Beijing olympics opening ceremony.  The ceremony involved 44 decorated vessels and cost HK$40 million (about US$5 million) to stage, lasting 90 minutes.  Tickets to the opening ceremony was sold at HK$1000.

Leader entrances
Special guest People's Republic of China State Councilor Liu Yandong is first introduced.  Chief executive of Hong Kong Donald Tsang, IOC President Jacques Rogge and East Asian games president Timothy Fok are then introduced.  They are seated among a panel of VIPs.

Fireworks & entrances
Fireworks at the harbour begins.  Then Ode to the Motherland is played while the Hong Kong police parade in.  The HKSAR and PRC flag is raised to the national anthem March of the Volunteers.  The theme song "Be the Legend" (創造傳奇) is played.  Then the different countries enter via the harbour by boat accompanied by fireworks.  They enter alphabetically by English characters.  The You are the Legend theme song is also played.

Performances
The artistic portion is split into four different parts.

Part 1
The "Fishing lights on Fragrant waters" (香江漁火) took place on a floating stage with colourful night view with dance scene.  It plays the popular HK song "Below the Lion Rock (獅子山下).  The song was performed many years ago by Cantopop singer Roman Tam.  These are accompanied by sailboat and wave dances.  This portion represents HK history with the junk sailing ships.

Part 2
The (活力都會) part then focus on a more modern HK.  On the floating stage Joey Yung sang the song "Run forward" (跑步機上).  She is accompanied by dancers.  The junk boats then use a more modern lighting.  This part ends with five firework shots display.

Part 3
The "Blessings for Hong Kong" (祝福香港) section is then opened up by Andy Lau.  He sings "If one day" (如果有一天) accompanied by violin virtuoso Li Chuan Yun.  This part also ends with five firework shots.

Part 4
The "Conglomeration of the Nine Dragons" (九龍匯聚) section celebrate the nine participating countries.  Usually nine dragons represent Kowloon.  Alan Tam performs the song You are the Legend.  He is accompanied by HK students.  Afterwards the 10 male, 14 female group Phoenix music troupe (鳳樂團) perform the "Nine nation drum beats" (九國鼓樂).  Flag waving performers then come out.

National flag bearers
The athletes of the 9 nations then come out onto the stage. The host region Hong Kong marched last. Guam entered as the penultimate region, as it is a member of the Oceania National Olympic Committees and an invitation team. Other countries and regions entered in English alphabetical order of their Olympic Council of Asia (OCA) designated names. Whilst most countries entered under their short names, a few entered under more formal or alternative names, sometimes due to political disputes. Taiwan (Republic of China) entered with the compromised name and flag of "Chinese Taipei" under T so that they did not enter together with conflicting "China", which entered under C. Similarly, South Korea entered as "Korea" under K while North Korea entered as "Democratic People's Republic of Korea" (shortened as DPR Korea on the placard).

Speech
Donald Tsang then gave a speech.  It was the first large scale international games ever hosted in HK.  It was also the largest east Asian games.  Timothy Fok then followed up with a speech.  They both gave their speech first in English, then again in Cantonese.  State Councilor Liu Yandong then opened the games up with a statement in Mandarin.  The firework displays begin.

Games flag bearer
The flag of East Asian games enters the stage carried by eight HK athletes.

The flag is then raised and the East Asian games song is played. HK ping pong player Li Ching (李靜) takes an oath.  Gary Au Yeung Kwok-kei (歐楊國棋) then take an oath.  Lee Lai-shan and Wong Kam-po arrives with the torch from the 2009 East Asian Games torch relay.  They join Cheung King-wai, Hannah Wilson and Chan Hei-man (陳晞文).   They all light the wave.

Fireworks
Final major firework display is accompanied by live singing from the float performed by artists such as Yumiko Cheng, Nicholas Tse, Vincy Chan, Priscilla Chan.  The ceremony finishes with You are the Legend.

External links
 East Asian games official site archive
 Xinhua opening photos

See also

 2008 Summer Olympics opening ceremony
 2009 East Asian Games torch relay
 2009 East Asian Games closing ceremony

References

Opening Ceremony, 2009 East Asian Games
Opening ceremonies at multi-sport events
Ceremonies in China